Grancey-le-Château-Neuvelle is a commune in the Côte-d'Or department in eastern France.

The castle was built between 1705 and 1725 by Jacques Eléonor Rouxel de Grancey on the location of a medieval fortress, erected in 1098 by Ponce de Grancey.

Population

See also
Communes of the Côte-d'Or department

References

Communes of Côte-d'Or